Focus NE (formerly called NE TV) was the first 24-hour satellite channel of North-East India, which covered the eight states of the region. It was also the first earth station and teleport of the northeast. Apart from news it also telecasted many infotainment programmes.

Primarily an Assamese language news channel, it also broadcasts regular Hindi bulletins.

Launched in March 2004, the channel is focused on youth and emerging society. Besides news bulletins, Focus NE offers its viewers programmes highlighting the socio-cultural, economic and political aspects of the North-East.

References
http://www.netvindia.com

External links
Official Website of NE TV

Defunct television channels in India
Indian direct broadcast satellite services
Television stations in Guwahati
Assamese-language mass media
Television channels and stations established in 2003
Mass media in Mizoram
Mass media in Assam